Hannerl and Her Lovers (German: Hannerl und ihre Liebhaber) is a 1936 Austrian comedy film directed by Werner Hochbaum and starring Olly von Flint,  Albrecht Schoenhals and Hans Moser. It was based on a novel that had previously been adapted as a 1921 silent film of the same title.

It was made at the Rosenhügel Studios in Vienna. The film's sets were designed by Emil Stepanek and Julius von Borsody.

Cast
 Olly von Flint as Hannerl  
 Albrecht Schoenhals as Van den Born  
 Hans Moser as Hafer, Hannerl's uncle  
 Jane Tilden as Mizzi 
 Rudolf Carl as Stiebitz  
 Hans Holt as Vigilati  
 Olga Tschechowa as Frau von Stahl 
 Anton Pointner as Robulja  
 Ernst Pröckl as Wendtmeyer 
 Anny Burg 
 Karl Ehmann 
 Richard Eybner 
 Camilla Gerzhofer 
 Mizzi Griebl 
 Helene Lauterböck 
 Fritz Müller 
 Hanns Obonya 
 Otto Storm

Cast
 Love Me and the World Is Mine (1928)

References

Bibliography 
 Bock, Hans-Michael & Bergfelder, Tim. The Concise Cinegraph: Encyclopaedia of German Cinema. Berghahn Books, 2009.

External links 
 

1936 films
Austrian comedy films
1930s German-language films
1936 comedy films
Films directed by Werner Hochbaum
Remakes of German films
Sound film remakes of silent films
Austrian black-and-white films
Films shot at Rosenhügel Studios